Rob Georg (born 24 September 1975) is a German country music singer. His records are regularly tracked in Nashville.

Biography
Georg was born in the city of Tübingen in Germany. As a child, he learned to play piano, as a teenager he switched to guitar and started to write his own songs. He bought his first guitar at the age of 14. Georg began his career with the song ‘Push That Horn’  which was released in June 2018. His first ever full band release from December 2018, the song "This Ain't My First Rodeo" made it into the US National Radio Hits AC Charts Top Ten. Also his following radio releases until today made it into the US National Radio Hits AC Charts, the song "Carry The Wind", which he wrote for his horse in heaven, was leading these charts for three weeks in October 2019, followed by "Dust" in being on position 1 in February 2020 and "Ghost in September 2020.

In January 2020 his Debut Album "Radio Cowboy" was released with 15 songs on it. They all tell stories about his life on the ranch and things he has been through. The nomination for two awards, the "New Music Award" in three categories in the US, the Fair Play Country Music Red Carpet Awards in the Netherlands and being announced the winner of the Country Artist of the Year 2020 Award by Warlock Asylum International News gave him a good start in early 2020. In March 2020 he won the New Music Award  in the category “Country Breakthrough Artist of the Year 2020“ in the US!

During the pandemic, both of Rob's parents were diagnosed with severe illnesses, so he decided to step in as a caretaker for his Mom and Dad. Utilizing the nights, he finally came up with new emotive country singles, which are published from March 2022 on, winning the next New Music Award in the category “Country Breakthrough Artist of the Year 2022“ in the United States!

Growing up with horses, Rob's professional path led him first into equine sports, especially into Cutting, a discipline of western riding, which is ridden on horses working cattle. From 2009 to 2018, he has successfully showed Cutting Horses in Europe and the USA and was on the board of the National Cutting Horse Association of Germany for 6 years, most of this time as president.

Influenced by the cowboy lifestyle, country music owns a big part of his musical passion. In various performances at family and friends events, Rob was always told, to do more with music in his life.

Discography
2022: Single Release: Cold War 
2022: Single Release: Last Call 
2022: Single Release: My Mother's Arms 
2022: Single Release: Climb This Mountain 
2020: Single Release: Higher Ground  
2020: Single Release: My Family's Fot Fur  
2020: Single Release: This Old House   
2020: Single Release: Radio Cowboy  
2020: Debut Album Release: Radio Cowboy 
2020: Single Release: This Gift Called Life 
2019: Single Release: When I Make It Home For Christmas
2019: Single Release: Harvest Moon Heart
2019: Single Release: Beast Made Of Steel 
2019: Single Release: Sunsets At The Ranch 
2019: Single Release: Time For Some Ink 
2019: Single Release: Ghost
2019: Single Release: Dust
2019: Single Release: Carry the Wind
2018: Single Release: This Ain't My First Rodeo
2018: Single Release: Push That Horn (feat. Mel Georg)
2018: Debut Single Release: Push That Horn

References

1975 births
Living people
German country musicians
German singer-songwriters